Mayfield School may refer to these schools:

in Canada:
 Mayfield Secondary School, Caledon, Ontario

in England:
 Mayfield School, East Sussex, Mayfield
 Mayfield School, Portsmouth, Hampshire
 Mayfield School, Ilford, London
 Mayfield Grammar School, Gravesend, Kent

in the United States:
 Mayfield High School (Ohio), Mayfield, Ohio
 Mayfield High School (Kentucky), Mayfield, Kentucky
 Mayfield High School (New Mexico), Las Cruces, New Mexico
 Mayfield Senior School, Pasadena, California